Jon Kondelik and James Kondelik, twin brothers, known together professionally as The Kondelik Brothers, are American filmmakers. They are known for their work in the films M Is for Masochist, Behind the Walls and Hornet.

Career
Jon and James first teamed up to write and direct the short film, M Is for Masochist, entered into ABCs of Death 2 film competition. In 2014, their film Airplane vs. Volcano, starring Dean Cain, produced by The Asylum. James is known as a film editor for the films Zombie Apocalypse and Abraham Lincoln vs. Zombies and Jon is known as an actor for the films The Amityville Haunting and 12/12/12.

In 2018, their first horror film Behind the Walls, starring Vanessa Angel, Reggie Lee and Lew Temple, released under the twin brother's Dual Visions Production. Their latest film Hornet, is produced by The Asylum.

Filmography

References

External links
 
 
 The Kondelik Brothers

American horror writers
American male screenwriters
Horror film directors
Living people
Sibling filmmakers
Year of birth missing (living people)
21st-century American screenwriters
21st-century American male writers